Tonya Nero (born 27 November 1988) is a Trinidad and Tobago long-distance runner.

She competed at the 2012, 2014, 2016 and 2018 editions of the World Half Marathon Championships. Her best finish was 27th at the 2012 edition in Kavarna, Bulgaria, when she set the Trinidad & Tobago national record with a time of 1:15:13.

She represented Trinidad and Tobago at the 2014 Commonwealth Games held in Glasgow, Scotland in the women's 10,000 metres event. She finished in 12th place out of 13 competitors. She competed in the women's marathon at the 2018 Commonwealth Games held in Gold Coast, Australia. She finished in 14th place.

In 2019, she competed in the women's 10,000 metres at the Pan American Games held in Lima, Peru. She finished in 10th place.

References

External links 
 

Living people
1988 births
Place of birth missing (living people)
Trinidad and Tobago female athletes
Commonwealth Games competitors for Trinidad and Tobago
Athletes (track and field) at the 2014 Commonwealth Games
Athletes (track and field) at the 2018 Commonwealth Games
Athletes (track and field) at the 2019 Pan American Games
Pan American Games competitors for Trinidad and Tobago